Ladurner is a surname. Notable people with the surname include:

Josef Alois Ladurner (1769–1851), Austrian composer
Sabine Ladurner (born 1960), Italian middle-distance and cross-country runner